The Movement of Militant Muslims is an Iranian Islamic socialist political group led by Habibollah Payman. The group had been revolutionary and is close to Council of Nationalist-Religious Activists of Iran.

References

1977 establishments in Iran
Anti-imperialist organizations
Islamic political parties in Iran
Islamic socialist political parties
Political parties established in 1977
Political parties of the Iranian Revolution
Social democratic parties in Asia
Socialist parties in Iran